John Harold Naumann (9 September 1893 – 6 December 1964) was an English cricketer active from 1913 to 1928 who played for Sussex. He was born in Lewisham and died in New York. He appeared in 44 first-class matches as a righthanded batsman who bowled left arm slow medium pace. He scored 1,391 runs with a highest score of 134 not out and took 36 wickets with a best performance of four for 37.

Notes

1893 births
1964 deaths
English cricketers
Sussex cricketers
Free Foresters cricketers
Cambridge University cricketers
Surrey cricketers
People from Lewisham
Cricketers from Greater London
H. D. G. Leveson Gower's XI cricketers